Splinters is a Canadian drama film, directed by Thom Fitzgerald and released in 2018. An adaptation of the theatrical play by Lee-Anne Poole, the film stars Sofia Banzhaf as Belle, a woman whose relationship with her mother Nancy (Shelley Thompson) has been strained since she came out as lesbian, but who now faces the prospect of coming out all over again as she now identifies as bisexual and is dating Rob (Callum Dunphy).

The film's cast also includes Mary-Colin Chisholm, Deb Allen, Hugh Thompson, Bailey Maughan and Stewart Legere.

The film premiered at the 2018 Toronto International Film Festival.

Reviewing the film for the National Post, Chris Knight noted some thematic similarities with Fitzgerald's debut film The Hanging Garden, and concluded that the film "may try to cram one too many revelations into its brief, 87-minute runtime. And it doesn’t always transcend its stagey origins. But it’s a beautiful homegrown tale, and deserves all the recognition it can muster in these times."

Awards and honors
ACTRA Award, Outstanding Performance by an Actor in a Leading Female Role, Shelley Thompson
ACTRA Award, Outstanding Performance by an Actor in a Leading Male Role, Bailey Maughan
ACTRA Award nomination, Outstanding Performance by an Actor in a Leading Male Role, Callum Dunphy
Atlantic Film Festival Joan Orenstein Award for Outstanding Performance by an Actress, Shelley Thompson
Screen Nova Scotia Award, Best Feature Film

References

External links
 
 Splinters at Library and Archives Canada

2018 films
2018 drama films
Canadian drama films
English-language Canadian films
Films directed by Thom Fitzgerald
Films based on Canadian plays
Canadian LGBT-related films
LGBT-related drama films
2018 LGBT-related films
Female bisexuality in film
2010s English-language films
2010s Canadian films